"All My Loving" is the eighth single by Japanese artist Masaharu Fukuyama. It was released on September 29, 1993.

Track listing
All My Loving

All My Loving (original karaoke)
 (original karaoke)

Oricon sales chart (Japan)

References

1993 singles
Masaharu Fukuyama songs